Two Soldiers may refer to:

 Two Soldiers (1943 film)
 Two Soldiers (2003 film)